The Eparchy of Mavelikara is a Syro-Malankara Catholic Church ecclesiastical territory or eparchy of the Catholic Church in India. It is a suffragan eparchy in the ecclesiastical province of the metropolitan Archeparchy of Trivandrum.

Its episcopal see is Mavelikkara, a taluk and municipality in the southern part of Alappuzha district of the southwestern Indian state of Kerala, on the banks of the Achankovil River.

It is the 6th eparchy of the Syro-Malankara Catholic Church, established on 2007.01.02 on territory formerly belonging to the Metropolitan archeparchies. It has 94 parishes and 37,000 members. The first bishop of this eparchy is Joshua Mar Ignathios. Patron saint is the Blessed Virgin Mary, to whom the cathedral is also devoted.

External links 
 Diocese of Mavelikara Official Website
 GigaCatholic

Syro-Malankara Catholic dioceses
Dioceses in Kerala
Dioceses established in the 21st century
Christian organizations established in 2007
2007 establishments in Kerala
Churches in Alappuzha district